Yuanmingyuan Park station is a station on Line 4 of the Beijing Subway.  The station is located outside of the south entrance to the Old Summer Palace in Haidian District of Beijing, and immediately faces the Zhengjue Temple to the north; the main campus of Peking University is to the south. There are three station exits: A, B, and C.

Station layout 
The station has an underground island platform.

Exits 
There are 3 exits, lettered A, B, and C. Exit C is accessible.

Gallery

References

External links
 

Beijing Subway stations in Haidian District
Railway stations in China opened in 2009